La Garçonne (The Bachelor Girl or The Flapper) is a 1936 French black-and-white film adaptation of the novel of the same name by Victor Margueritte. It was directed by Jean de Limur and starred Marie Bell (in the title role), Arletty and Edith Piaf.

Plot
The eponymous garçonne or flapper is Monique Lerbier, an emancipated French woman who leaves home to escape a marriage of convenience to a man she does not love which her parents have forced on her.  She then falls into all sorts of carnal temptations and artificial pleasures previously unknown to her.  These include her being seduced into a lesbian love affair by a chanteuse character (played by Edith Piaf), ensuring the film became a succès de scandale.  Another actress in the film, Arletty, said of it:

Cast
 Marie Bell : Monique Lerbier
 Arletty : Niquette
 Henri Rollan : Régis Boisselot
 Maurice Escande : Lucien Vigneret
 Jaque Catelain : Georges Blanchet
 Pierre Etchepare : Plombino
 Philippe Hersent : Peer Rys
 Jean Worms : Monsieur Lerbier
 Marcelle Praince : Madame Lerbier
 Vanda Gréville : Élisabeth
 Suzy Solidor : Anika
 Édith Piaf : the chanteuse
 Jean Tissier : Monsieur des Souzaies
 Marcelle Géniat : Aunt Sylvestre
 Junie Astor  
 Jane Marken

Crew
 Director : Jean de Limur
 Writers: Albert Dieudonné after the novel of the same name by Victor Margueritte (Éditions Flammarion, 1922)
 Adaptation : Marion Fort
 Dialogue : Jacques Natanson 
 Music : Jean Wiener
 Song : Quand même, sung by Édith Piaf, lyrics by Louis Poterat, music by Jean Wiener
 Cinematography: Roger Hubert, Charlie Bauer
 Sound engineers : Robert Tesseire
 Design : Lucien Aguettand
 Editing : Jean Oser

Production details
 Production company : Franco London Films (France)
 Principal photography : Began in December 1935
 Format : Black-and-white — Monophonic sound — 35 mm

References

External links

1936 films
French LGBT-related films
Lesbian-related films
Films directed by Jean de Limur
Films based on French novels
French drama films
1936 drama films
French black-and-white films
1930s LGBT-related films
Flappers
1930s French films